Charles James II (born May 14, 1990) is a former American football cornerback. He played college football at Charleston Southern, and signed with the New York Giants as an undrafted free agent in 2013. James has also been a member of the Houston Texans, Baltimore Ravens, Indianapolis Colts, Buffalo Bills, Jacksonville Jaguars, Memphis Express, St. Louis BattleHawks, and Houston Roughnecks.

Professional career

New York Giants
James was signed by the New York Giants on May 10, 2013 as an undrafted free agent. He was released on August 31, 2013 and was signed to the practice squad the next day. He was promoted to the active roster on October 5, 2013 where he played in 12 regular season games mostly on special teams. James was released by the Giants on August 26, 2014.

First stint with Texans
James was signed to the Houston Texans' practice squad on October 1, 2014 and was promoted to the active roster on December 29, 2014. He was released by the Texans on September 5, 2015.

Baltimore Ravens
James was signed to the Baltimore Ravens' practice squad on September 8, 2015. On October 13, 2015, he was signed to the active roster. On October 17, 2015 James was waived by the Ravens.

Second stint with Texans
James was claimed off waivers by the Texans on October 19, 2015. He was placed on injured reserve on December 28, 2015 with a foot injury. He was re-signed by the Texans on March 7, 2016.

On December 5, 2016, James was waived by the Texans.

Indianapolis Colts
James signed with the Indianapolis Colts on December 12, 2016. He was released on May 1, 2017.

Buffalo Bills
On May 2, 2017, James was claimed off waivers by the Buffalo Bills. He was waived on August 12, 2017.

Jacksonville Jaguars
James was claimed off waivers by the Jacksonville Jaguars on August 14, 2017. He was released on September 1, 2017.

Memphis Express
In 2019, James signed with the Memphis Express of the Alliance of American Football. The league ceased operations in April 2019.

St. Louis BattleHawks
On October 16, 2019, James was drafted by the XFL to play for the St. Louis BattleHawks.

Houston Roughnecks
James was traded to the Houston Roughnecks on January 21, 2020. He had his contract terminated when the league suspended operations on April 10, 2020.

References

1990 births
Living people
Mandarin High School alumni
Players of American football from Jacksonville, Florida
American football cornerbacks
Charleston Southern Buccaneers football players
New York Giants players
Houston Texans players
Baltimore Ravens players
Indianapolis Colts players
Buffalo Bills players
Jacksonville Jaguars players
Memphis Express (American football) players
St. Louis BattleHawks players
Houston Roughnecks players